Senator Coon may refer to:

Reuben W. Coon (1842–1908), Illinois State Senate
Sam Coon (1903–1980), Oregon State Senate

See also
Chris Coons (born 1963), U.S. Senator from Delaware since 2010